Gmina Adamów may refer to either of the following rural administrative districts in Lublin Voivodeship in eastern Poland:
Gmina Adamów, Łuków County
Gmina Adamów, Zamość County